Nebria hiekei is a species of black coloured beetle from a family Carabidae that is endemic to Qinghai, province of China.

References

hiekei
Beetles described in 1982
Beetles of Asia
Endemic fauna of China